Isabel Bannerman (born March 14 1962) is a British garden designer and writer, known for her work in restoring historical gardens and creating new ones.

Awards and honors
Gold Medal at the RHS Chelsea Flower Show in 1994

1997 Royal Warrant awarded by the Prince of Wales

2007 Christie's Garden of the Year Award for Houghton Hall.

In 2010 the Bannermans along with public garden designer Lynden Miller completed the Queen Elizabeth II September 11th Garden, located in Hanover Square in the Financial District of New York City.  It commemorates the 67 British victims of the September 11, 2001 attack on the World Trade Center. Queen Elizabeth II attended the opening on July 6, 2010.

Publications

Isabel Bannerman is also a published author, having co-written several books with her husband Julian, including "Landscape of Dreams: The Gardens of Isabel and Julian Bannerman" (2016) and "Husbandry: Making Gardens with Mr. B" (2021). The latter book chronicles their experiences in creating gardens at Trematon Castle in Cornwall and Ashington Manor in Somerset.

Personal life

Isabel Bannerman and Julian Bannerman have lived in several historical properties throughout their career, including Hanham Court near Bristol, Trematon Castle in Cornwall, and Ashington Manor in Somerset. They have collaborated on many garden restoration and design projects together, with Isabel focusing on planting and Julian focusing on architecture and structure.

References 

British writers
British garden writers
British gardeners
Living people
Year of birth missing (living people)